State Road 59 (SR 59) runs north to south through the eastern Florida Panhandle, with a northern terminus at US 90 near Lloyd, one major intersection at Interstate 10 at exit 217, and a southern terminus at US 98 in rural Jefferson County.

The route is extended at both ends by county roads; to the north through Leon County to the Georgia state line, where it becomes State Route 122 to Thomasville; and on the south via County Road 59, a former secondary state route, into the Saint Marks National Wildlife Refuge.

Major intersections

References

External links

Florida Route Log (SR 59)
Big Bend Scenic Byway (Florida Scenic Highways)

059
059
059
059
059